The Bharatiya Jana Sangh ( BJS or JS, short name: Jan Sangh, full name: Akhil Bharatiya Jana Sangh) (ISO 15919:  Akhila Bhāratīya Jana Saṅgha  )  was an Indian right wing political party that existed from 1951 to 1977 and  was the political arm of Rashtriya Swayamsevak Sangh (RSS), a Hindu nationalist volunteer organisation. In 1977, it merged with several other left, centre and right parties opposed to the Indian National Congress and formed the Janata Party. In 1980, Jana Sangh faction broke away from Janata Party over the issue of dual membership (of the political Janata Party and the social organization RSS), and formed the Bharatiya Janata Party.

Origins

Many members of the right-wing Hindu nationalist Rashtriya Swayamsevak Sangh (RSS) began to contemplate  the formation of a political party to continue their work, begun in the days of the British Raj, and take their ideology further. Around the same time, Syama Prasad Mukherjee left the Hindu Mahasabha political party that he had once led because of a disagreement with that party over permitting non-Hindu membership. The BJS was subsequently started by Mukherjee on 21 October 1951 in Delhi, with the collaboration of the RSS, as a "nationalistic alternative" to the Congress Party.

The symbol of the party in Indian elections was an oil lamp and, like the RSS, its ideology was centred on Hindutva. In the 1952 general elections to the Parliament of India, BJS won three seats, Mukherjee being one of the winning candidates. The BJS would often link up on issues and debates with the centre-right Swatantra Party of Chakravarti Rajagopalachari. After the death of Mukherjee in 1953, RSS activists in the BJS edged out the career politicians and made it a political arm of the RSS and an integral part of the RSS family of organisations (Sangh Parivar).

The strongest election performance of the BJS came in the 1967 Lok Sabha election in which it won 35 seats, when the Congress majority was its thinnest ever.

Ideology

The BJS was ideologically close to the RSS, and derived most of its political activist base and candidates from the RSS ranks. It also attracted many economically conservative members of Congress who were disenchanted with the more socialist policies and politics of Jawaharlal Nehru and the Congress Party. The BJS's strongest constituencies were in Rajasthan, Gujarat, Maharashtra, Madhya Pradesh, Bihar and Uttar Pradesh.

The BJS leadership strongly supported a stringent policy against Pakistan and China, and were averse to the USSR and communism. Many BJS leaders also inaugurated the drive to ban cow slaughter nationwide in the early 1960s.

Emergency of 1975
In 1975, Indira Gandhi declared a state of Emergency, and threw many major opposition politicians in jail including the leaders of the BJS. In 1977, the Emergency was withdrawn, and elections were held. The BJS, joined forces with the Bharatiya Lok Dal, the Congress (O), and the Socialist Party, to form the Janata Party (People's Party). The Janata Party became the first Indian government not led by what was by then called the Indian National Congress. Former BJS leaders Atal Bihari Vajpayee and L. K. Advani became the External Affairs (Foreign), and Information and Broadcasting Ministers respectively.

Chronological list of presidents

In general elections 
The Bharatiya Jana Sangh was created in 1951, and the first general election it contested was in 1951–52, in which it won only three Lok Sabha seats, in line with the four seats won by Hindu Mahasabha and three seats won by Ram Rajya Parishad.  Shyama Prasad Mookerjee and Durga Charan Banerjee were elected from Bengal and Uma Shankar Trivedi from Rajasthan. All the like-minded parties formed a block in the Parliament, led by Shyama Prasad Mookerjee.

References

Sources

Further reading
 
 
 

 
Anti-monarchists
Anti-communist parties
Anti-communism in India
Anti-Islam sentiment in India 
Political parties established in 1951
Bharatiya Janata Party
Defunct political parties in India
Indian Hindu political parties
Political parties disestablished in 1977
Hindu political parties 
Hindu organisations based in India
Hindu nationalism
Hindutva 
1951 establishments in India
1977 disestablishments in India
Conservative parties in India
Right-wing parties in Asia 
Right-wing parties